Arizona's 15th Legislative District is one of 30 in the state, situated entirely in Maricopa County. As of 2021, there are 42 precincts in the district, with a total registered voter population of 163,938. The district has an overall population of 233,313.

Political representation
The district is represented for the 2021–2022 Legislative Session in the State Senate by Nancy Barto (R) and in the House of Representatives by Steve Kaiser (R) and Justin Wilmeth (R).

References

Maricopa County, Arizona
Arizona legislative districts